Tyler Brickler (born January 27, 1991) is a Korean American professional ice hockey player who last played for the Dundee Stars in the Elite Ice Hockey League (EIHL). Brickler previously played for High1 in the Asia League Ice Hockey (AL).

Playing career
Brickler was born in Chicago, Illinois to an American father and a South Korean mother. Brickler played minor ice hockey for the Chicago Mission, before being selected by the USA Hockey National Team Development Program (NTDP) Final 40 Camp Roster. After attending the camp, Brickler signed as a free agent to play for the Lincoln Stars in the USHL and was selected by current Tampa Bay Lightning head coach Jon Cooper to play for the USA U17 National Team in the Ivan Hlinka Memorial Five Nations Tournament in Prague, Czech Republic, where the team won silver. Brickler then continued to play for the Green Mountain Glades (EJHL), the Sioux City Musketeers (USHL), and the Westside Warriors (BCHL), before playing NCAA Division I Ice Hockey for the UMass Lowell River Hawks in the Hockey East Conference. He then transferred to the State University of New York - SUNY Geneseo where he played NCAA Division III Ice Hockey for the remainder of his college career in the State University of New York Athletic Conference (SUNYAC). Brickler was the top scorer for his team the last two seasons and led SUNY Geneseo to their first ever Frozen Four appearance in 2014, by scoring a natural hat trick in a 3-2 comeback victory over Norwich University.

After graduating SUNY Geneseo, Brickler was invited by the Korea Ice Hockey Association to attend the South Korea Men's National Ice Hockey Team Evaluation Camp in March 2015. Being ineligible to play in the IIHF Ice Hockey World Championships, Brickler then signed as a free agent to professional hockey team High1.

In June 2017, Brickler moved to the UK to sign for the Dundee Stars of the EIHL. He left the team in October 2017.

Career statistics

References

External links

1991 births
Living people
American men's ice hockey forwards
High1 players
Dundee Stars players
Ice hockey people from Chicago
State University of New York at Geneseo alumni
American sportspeople of Korean descent
American expatriate ice hockey players in South Korea
American expatriate ice hockey players in Scotland
American expatriate ice hockey players in Canada